is a Japanese women's professional shogi player ranked 2-kyū.

Early life and becoming a women's professional shogi player
Umezu was born in Bunkyō, Tokyo on September 1, 2007. She became interested in shogi from watching the anime TV series version of the manga March Comes In like a Lion. Under the guidance of shogi professional Makoto Tobe, she entered the Kantō branch of Japan Shogi Association's training group system in September 2021 as a member of training group B2, was subsequently promoted to training group B1 in December 2021, and qualified for women's professional status in April 2022 for entering the training group system at training group B2 or above and playing 48 games or more at that level.

Promotion history
Umezu's promotion history is as follows.

 2-kyū: July 1, 2022

Note: All ranks are women's professional ranks.

References

External links
 ShogiHub: Umezu, Mikoto

2007 births
Living people
Japanese shogi players
Women's professional shogi players
Professional shogi players from Tokyo Metropolis